Ull or ULL may refer to:

University:
 University of La Laguna, a university in Canary Islands, Spain
 University of Louisiana at Lafayette, a research university in the USA

Other:
 Ullr or Ull, a Germanic god
 Ull (Greyhawk), a political state in the fictional World of Greyhawk
 Non-Party List, a defunct political party in Liechtenstein
 SK Ull, a Norwegian Nordic skiing club
 Ullatan language, an extinct and unclassified Dravidian language
 Ullensaker/Kisa IL, a Norwegian sports club
 Ulleskelf railway station, in North Yorkshire, England